Isabella Grant (born 21 September 2001) is an Australian rules footballer playing for  in the AFL Women's (AFLW). She was drafted with the forty-seventh selection in the 2020 AFL Women's draft by the  under the Father-daughter rule. She was educated at Caulfield Grammar School.

Early football
Grant began her junior career at Spotswood Football Club in the Western Region Football League in 2016. She played in the Under 15 girls division, and then continued playing for the next four years, where she won three premierships and a best and fairest medal, won while playing in the Under 15s division. She kicked 12 goals for her club in 2017, the highest out of anyone playing in the team. She was also nominated for the U18 best and fairest award in 2017. Grant began playing for the Western Jets in the NAB League in 2019. She played 6 games and kicked 1 goal, while averaging17.2 disposals a game. Grant was named on the half-forward flank in the NAB League girls team of the year for 2019. She represented Vic Metro in the 2019 AFL Women's Under 18 Championships, having a standout game against Vic Country where she kicked 3 goals.

AFLW career
Grant missed out on the 2020 AFL Women's season due to an ongoing foot injury. She debuted in the 3rd round of the 2021 AFL Women's season, where she collected 8 disposals and 1 mark. She only had one more game for the season, before being omitted. It was revealed that Grant had signed a contract extension with the club on 16 June 2021, after playing 2 games with the club that season.

Statistics
Statistics are correct to the end of the 2021 season.

|-
! scope="row" style="text-align:center" | 2020
|style="-*+-*+-+text-align:center;"|
| 3 || 0 || — || — || — || — || — || — || — || — || — || — || — || — || — || — || 0
|- style="background-color: #eaeaea"
! scope="row" style="text-align:center" | 2021
|style="-*+-*+-+text-align:center;"|
| 3 || 2 || 0 || 0 || 9 || 4 || 13 || 1 || 3 || 0.0 || 0.0 || 4.5 || 2.0 || 6.5 || 0.5 || 1.5 || 
|- 
|- class="sortbottom"
! colspan=3| Career
! 1
! 0
! 0
! 9
! 4
! 13
! 1
! 3
! 0.0
! 0.0
! 4.5
! 2.0
! 6.5
! 0.5
! 1.5
! 0
|}

References

2001 births
Living people
Western Bulldogs (AFLW) players
Western Jets players (NAB League Girls)
Australian rules footballers from Victoria (Australia)